Video gaming in the Philippines is an emerging industry and pastime that includes the production, sale, distribution, and playing of video games.  The Philippine eSports Organization (PeSO) is an esports entity that is the official Philippine representative to the International eSports Federation (IeSF), which is one of the largest esports associations in the world. It carries the interests of the Filipino esports community in the international arena.

Demographics

NIKO Media Research projected the number of PC Gamers to rise from 21 million in 2012 to 28.72 million in 2014.

Game development industry

The Philippines is a minor player regarding the game development industry. In 2011, it was reported that the local industry only has a 0.02% market share of the $90 billion global industry. The majority of the game development industry is focused on outsourcing to foreign companies rather than creation of local content. According to the Game Developers Association of the Philippines (GDAP), there are about 4,000 professionals representing about 60 companies involved in the game development industry as of 2013. The Philippines' primary competitors in this field are China, Singapore, Malaysia and Vietnam.

The first Filipino-developed commercial computer game was Anito: Defend a Land Enraged which was released in November 2003. 2 months prior to the release of Anito, in September 2003, a free and open source Solitaire card game named Drac was also released by Rico Zuñiga, which makes Drac the first Filipino-developed computer game and game development framework. Drac was also used to create another card game based on the rules of the popular Filipino game, Tong-its which was released in November 2003.

In 2016 the French video game development company Ubisoft announced plans to establish a subsidiary in the country, which opened on March 28, 2016, in Santa Rosa, Laguna in partnership with De La Salle University.

The University of The Visayas New School (UVNS) offers esports and game development through their Senior High Arts and Design track. UVNS offers subjects like game theory, mechanics, strategy, and game awareness. Students can also pick up game design, branding, and shoutcasting as well as entrepreneurship.

After the return qualification of two Filipino teams for the world DOTA 2 tournament in 2017, esports backers like Sen. Bam Aquino see the potential of the online gaming industry to bring honor to the country while creating jobs and ushering in investments.

In esports

Due to the popularity of video gaming in the Philippines, various outlets have conducted tournaments from local to international levels. In 2016 the Manila Cup held various gaming competitions with participation by local and international players, featuring games such as Mortal Kombat XL, BlazBlue Chronophantasma and Street Fighter. Big name conventions such as the Asia Pop Comic Convention and eSports and Gaming Summit hold various video game tournaments as part of their programs.

The surging popularity of esports in the Philippines has led to various Filipino teams competing in renowned eSports tournaments worldwide, even producing champions over different tournaments.

In 2017, a national eSports league was established which is called The Nationals.

Esports was introduced for the first time as a medal event in the 2019 Southeast Asian Games in which the Philippines hosted.

2010s-onward: Uprising of independent video games

Controversies and issues

1981 ban on video games
On November 19, 1981, President Ferdinand Marcos banned video games in the country through a combination of Presidential Decree 519 and later Letter of Instruction No. 1176 s. 81 making the Philippines the first nation to ban video games. The decree was a response to complaints from parents and educators who alleged that games such as Space Invaders and Asteroids were detrimental to youth morals, viewing them as a "destructive social enemy" and existing "to the detriment of the public interest". Marcos also decreed the ban of pinball machines, slot machines, and other similar gaming devices. Filipinos were given two weeks to either destroy their video games and devices or surrender the materials to the police and army. Violators had to pay a fine amounting to about $600 and face 6 months to 1 year of prison. Playing video games in the country went underground. The ban was effectively lifted following the 1986 People Power Revolution.

Localized ban on Defense of the Ancients
While no video games have been banned nationwide since 1986, at least one title, Defense of the Ancients, including its upcoming installments, has been banned at a barangay in Dasmariñas, Cavite following complaints of delinquency and two murder incidents involving youths in the area resulting from brawls related to the game. The ban however, only covers internet shops and does not extend to computers in private homes.

Copyright infringement
Unauthorized distribution of video games is a complex issue in the Philippines. Despite legislation against copyright violation, enforcement and cultural factors remain an obstacle in the country. Bootleg video games, along with warez, contribute to the underground economy of the country where video gaming is a popular form of entertainment among Filipino families. The inability of many Filipino families to afford video game software and hardware at legitimate prices leads them to turn to unlicensed goods. The Optical Media Board in cooperation with the police enforces intellectual rights law in the country.

Video Game Development

Game developers from Philippines

Orc Chop Games (Manila studio)
Squeaky Wheel Studio
TOSE Philippines, Inc (Filipino branch)

Misc Games

Altitude Games (Mobile games)
Anino Inc. (Ex-Anino Playlab, Anino Games, Inc. Slots games.)
Digital Art Chefs (Art/illustration, comic books, storyboards, fashion design)
Komikasi Games and Entertainment (Online & mobile games; art/illustration, web & mobile app development)
Ranida Games (Primarily mobile games. Advergames & gamification.)
Synergy88 Digital (Animation & interactive entertainment)
Drix Studios (Game development studio from Naga City, Camarines Sur known for Grand Guilds)
Mazur Studios (Game development studio from Naga City, Camarines Sur

Co-development Services

FunGuy Studio (Mobile games. Also web/digital marketing.)
Secret 6, Inc. (Game & art)
Whimsy Games (Filipino branch. Co-development, monetization, marketing.)

Defunct video game developers

Zeenoh Inc. (Founded 2008. Inactive after 2018.)

Video game publishers of Philippines

Level Up! Games

Defunct video game publishers

CatHuntTree (Publisher & dev)
IP E-Games (Founded 2005. Merged with Level Up! Games in 2012.)

References

 
Mass media in the Philippines